Serhiy Hryn may refer to:
Serhiy Hryn (footballer) (born 1994), Ukrainian footballer
Serhiy Hryn (rower) (born 1981), Ukrainian rower